Geir Karlsen (born in 1965) is a Norwegian business magnate. He is best known as the CEO and former CFO of Norwegian Air Shuttle, Scandinavia's largest airline, and Europe's third largest low-cost airline.

Biography 
Before Norwegian Air Shuttle, Geir Karlsen worked for Golden Ocean Group and Songa Offshore. Then, he held the position Group CFO at London-based Navig8 Group.

From April 2018 to July 2019, he was Chief Financial Officer of the Scandinavian airline.

Geir Karlsen has a degree in business administration from BI Norwegian Business School.

References

1965 births
Living people
BI Norwegian Business School alumni
Norwegian airline chief executives
Norwegian Air Shuttle
People from Sykkylven